Paul Goodman is a Grammy award-winning sound engineer, with awards in 1983 for Mahler: Symphony No. 7 in E Minor (Song of the Night), in 1985 for Prokofiev: Symphony No. 5 in B Flat, Op. 100, and in 1987 for Horowitz - The Studio Recordings, New York 1985. In addition to classical music, he has also worked on notable jazz albums, including the avant-garde jazz album Communications, performed by Jazz Composer's Orchestra and 1974's Musique du Bois, by Phil Woods.

Raised in Newark, New Jersey, Gordon graduated from Weequahic High School in 1945.

References

Year of birth missing (living people)
Living people
Grammy Award winners
Audio production engineers
People from Newark, New Jersey
Weequahic High School alumni